Albanvale Football Club is an Australian rules football club located 18 km west of Melbourne in the suburb of Deer Park. Albanvale is affiliated with the Western Region Football League. The club had a brief stint in the Victorian Amateur Football Association between 1989 and 1991.

Known as the Cobras, the club was established in 1978 by a group of interested parents and youths from the fast-growing new community situated in the corridor between St Albans and Deer Park, who identified a need to create sporting opportunities for the young people of the area.

Albanvale ground location is at Robert Bruce Reserve on the corner of Station and Neale Roads, Deer Park. The oval started off as little more than a rough paddock and the "clubrooms" consisted of a simple tin shed. However, through the commitment of its members, committees and the assistance of the former City of Sunshine, permanent change-rooms which are still used today were constructed and a formal playing surface was prepared.

Albanvale Football Club currently has approximately 260 registered players competing in Under 10, Under 13, Under 15, Under 18, Reserve and Senior grades. Many of the players have had a long association with the Club and it is not unusual for players to achieve significant career milestones as 150 or 200 games whilst still playing within the Junior ranks.

The Club is competitive at all levels with a number of premiership victories at different Junior levels.

External links
 Official site

Western Region Football League clubs
Australian rules football clubs in Melbourne
1978 establishments in Australia
Australian rules football clubs established in 1978
Victorian Amateur Football Association clubs
Sport in the City of Brimbank